The Very Long Fuse is the debut EP by American post-punk band Breaking Circus.  It was released in 1985 by on Homestead Records.

Critical reception
Trouser Press called the EP "terse, post-punk vitriol set to a banging dance-beat drum machine."

Track listing
"Precision"
"(Knife in the) Marathon"
"Lady in the Lake"
"Soul of Japan"
"The Imperial Clawmasters' Theme"
"Monster's Sanctuary"
"Christian Soldiers"
"Morning"

Personnel
Steve Björklund - guitar, bass, Roland TR-606 drum machine
Steve Albini - cover artwork

References

Breaking Circus albums
1985 debut EPs
Homestead Records EPs